Nentwigia is a monotypic genus of Southeast Asian dwarf spiders containing the single species, Nentwigia diffusa. It was first described by Alfred Frank Millidge in 1995, and has only been found in Indonesia and Thailand.

See also
 List of Linyphiidae species (I–P)

References

Linyphiidae
Monotypic Araneomorphae genera
Spiders of Asia